The Odd Fellows and Confederate Cemetery, at the corner of Cemetery and Commerce Streets in Grenada, Mississippi is a historic cemetery.  It includes Gothic architecture, Romanesque architecture, Classical architecture.  It was listed on the National Register of Historic Places in 1988, for architectural criteria.

The Confederate section contains about 150 graves of Confederate soldiers who died in the Grenada area.

The cemeteries may contain burials from several specific calamities.  Grenada suffered a tornado on May 7, 1846, which destroyed 112 houses and killed 21 persons.  And it suffered a fire in 1855 which burned about half of the town's buildings.  And soon after the fall of Vicksburg, Grenada was site of a Union cavalry raid on August 18 and 19, 1863, which overwhelmed a token defensive force and destroyed the town's railway depot, railyard buildings, eighty locomotives and 200 freight cars.

The cemetery may also include burials of victims of a devastating Yellow Fever epidemic in 1878 which killed at least 363 individuals, including the mayor, of a town of about 2,000 total population.

References

External links
 
 

Cemeteries on the National Register of Historic Places in Mississippi
Odd Fellows cemeteries in the United States
National Register of Historic Places in Grenada County, Mississippi